The 2005–06 Greek Basket League season was the 66th season of the Greek Basket League, the highest tier professional basketball league in Greece. The winner of the league was Panathinaikos, which beat Olympiacos in the league's playoff's finals. The teams Iraklis and Kolossos Rodou were relegated to the Greek A2 League.

Teams

Regular season

Standings 

Pts=Points, P=Matches played, W=Matches won, L=Matches lost, F=Points for, A=Points against, D=Points difference

Results

Playoffs

Bracket

Quarterfinals

(1) Panathinaikos vs. (8) Panionios 
Panathinaikos win the series 2-0

(2) Olympiacos vs. (7) AEK Athens 
Olympiacos win the series 2-0

(3) Maroussi vs. (6) PAOK 
Maroussi win the series 2-1

(4) Aris vs. (5) Panellinios 
Aris win the series 2-0

Semifinals

(1) Panathinaikos vs. (4) Aris 
Panathinaikos win the series 3-0

(2) Olympiacos vs. (3) Maroussi 
Olympiacos win the series 3-2

3rd place

(3) Maroussi vs. (4) Aris 
Aris win the series 3-2

Finals

(1) Panathinaikos vs. (2) Olympiacos 
Panathinaikos win the series 3-0

Game 1

Game 2

Game 3

Final league table 

 PAOK and AEK took the places of Maroussi and Panellinios in the Eurocup 2006–07 Regular Season.

Greek League Best Five

League leaders regular season 
Points

Rebounds

Assists

Steals

Blocks

Source: Galanis Sports Data

League leaders playoffs 

Points

Rebounds

Assists

Steals

Blocks

Source: Galanis Sports Data

External links 
 Official HEBA Site
 Official Hellenic Basketball Federation Site
 A1 League at Sportime magazine (Greek)
 Galanis Sports Data

Greek Basket League seasons
1
Greek